Bolas is a throwing weapon made of weights on the ends of interconnected cord.

Bolas may also refer to:

People with the name
 Mark Bolas, a virtual reality researcher
 Niko Bolas, an American music producer

Other uses
 Bolas (horse)
 Bolas spider, a spider in which the adult females catch prey using a sticky drop on a line, resembling a bolas
 Nicol Bolas, a fictional planeswalker in Magic: the Gathering
 BOLAS (spacecraft), a proposed lunar orbiter

See also
 Bola (disambiguation)
 Bolo ball
 Bolo bat
 Bolus (disambiguation)